Harringworth railway station was a railway station near Harringworth, Northamptonshire.

The former signal box which is a listed structure has been preserved by the Northampton & Lamport Railway and is currently stored at Pitsford and Brampton station.

February 2014: Station in private ownership - no access.

References

Disused railway stations in Northamptonshire
Former Midland Railway stations
Railway stations in Great Britain opened in 1880
Railway stations in Great Britain closed in 1948